Gaby Mellado (born June 14, 1992, in Orizaba, Mexico) is a Mexican television actress.

Filmography

Awards and nominations

References

External links 

1992 births
Mexican telenovela actresses
21st-century Mexican actresses
Actresses from Veracruz
Living people